"Impossible" is a song by the band Anberlin. It is the second track and first single from their fifth studio album, Dark Is the Way, Light Is a Place. The song officially hit radio on July 12, 2010.

Charts

References

Anberlin songs
2010 singles
2010 songs
Universal Republic Records singles